Robert Martin Culp (August 16, 1930 – March 24, 2010) was an American actor widely known for his work in television. Culp earned an international reputation for his role as Kelly Robinson on I Spy (1965–1968), the espionage television series in which co-star Bill Cosby and he played secret agents. Before this, he starred in the CBS/Four Star Western series Trackdown as Texas Ranger Hoby Gilman in 71 episodes from 1957 to 1959. The 1980s brought him back to television as FBI Agent Bill Maxwell on The Greatest American Hero. Later, he had a recurring role as Warren Whelan on Everybody Loves Raymond, and played as a voice actor in computer game's like Half-Life 2. Culp gave hundreds of performances in a career spanning more than 50 years.

Early life
Culp was born on August 16, 1930, in either Oakland, California, or Berkeley, California. He was the only child of Crozier Cordell Culp, an attorney, and his wife, Bethel Martin Culp (née Collins). He graduated from Berkeley High School, where he was a pole vaulter and took second place at the 1947 CIF California State Meet.

Culp attended the University of the Pacific in Stockton, California, but did not graduate. He later attended Washington University in St. Louis, San Francisco State, and the University of Washington School of Drama, but never completed an academic degree. He received his acting training at HB Studio in New York City.

Career

Television performances

Culp came to national attention early in his career as the star of the 1957–1959 CBS Western television series Trackdown, in which he played Texas Ranger Hoby Gilman, based in the town of Porter, Texas. It was one of Culp's many appearances in TV Westerns. The pilot for Trackdown was "Badge of Honor", a 1956 episode of Dick Powell's Zane Grey Theatre, in which Culp starred as Gilman. 

In 1960, he appeared in two more episodes of Zane Grey Theatre, playing different roles in "Morning Incident" and "Calico Bait". After Trackdown ended in 1959 after two seasons, Culp continued to work in television, including a guest-starring role as Stewart Douglas in the 1960 episode "So Dim the Light" of CBS's anthology series The DuPont Show with June Allyson. In the summer of 1960, he guest-starred on David McLean's NBC Western series Tate.

He played Clay Horne in the series finale, "Cave-In", of the CBS Western Johnny Ringo, starring Don Durant. In 1961, Culp played the part of Craig Kern, a morphine-addicted soldier, in the episode "Incident on Top of the World" in the CBS series Rawhide. About this time, Culp was cast on the NBC anthology series, The Barbara Stanwyck Show and in the NBC Civil War drama, The Americans. Culp was cast as Captain Shark in a first-season episode of NBC's The Man from U.N.C.L.E. (1964). Some of his more memorable performances were in three episodes of the science-fiction anthology series on The Outer Limits (1963–65), including the classic "Demon with a Glass Hand", written by Harlan Ellison. In the 1961 season, he guest-starred on the NBC's Western Bonanza. In the 1961–62 season, he guest-starred on ABC's crime drama Target: The Corruptors! and that network's The Rifleman. In the 1962–63 season, he guest-starred in NBC's modern Western series Empire starring Richard Egan.

In 1964, Culp played Charlie Orwell, an alcoholic veterinarian, in an episode of The Virginian (NBC 1962–1971) titled "The Stallion". That same year, he appeared in yet another Western, Gunsmoke. In the series' episode "Hung High", he portrays an outlaw named Joe Costa, who attempts to frame Matt Dillon for lynching a prisoner who had killed the marshal's friend. In 1965, he was cast as Frank Melo in "The Tender Twigs" of James Franciscus's NBC education drama series, Mr. Novak.

Culp then played perhaps his most memorable character, CIA secret agent Kelly Robinson, who operated undercover as a touring tennis professional, for three years on the hit NBC series I Spy (1965–1968), with co-star Bill Cosby. Culp wrote the scripts for seven episodes, one of which he also directed and an episode earned him an Emmy nomination for writing. For all three years of the series, he was also nominated for an acting Emmy (Outstanding Performance by an Actor in a Leading Role in a Dramatic Series category), but lost each time to Cosby.

In 1968, Culp also made an uncredited cameo appearance as an inebriated Turkish waiter on Get Smart, the spy-spoof comedy series, in an I Spy parody episode titled "Die Spy". In this, secret agent Maxwell Smart played by Don Adams in effect assumes Culp's Kelly Robinson character, as he pretends to be an international table-tennis champion. The episode faithfully recreates the I Spy theme music, montage graphics, and back-and-forth banter between Robinson and Scott, with actor/comedian Stu Gilliam imitating Cosby.

In 1971, Culp, Peter Falk, Robert Wagner, and Darren McGavin each stepped in to take turns with Anthony Franciosa's rotation of NBC's series The Name of the Game after Franciosa was fired, alternating a lead role of the lavish, 90-minute show about the magazine business with Gene Barry and Robert Stack. Also in 1971, he portrayed an unemployed actor, the husband of ambitious Angie Dickinson, in the TV movie See the Man Run. Culp played the murderer in three Columbo episodes ("Death Lends a Hand" in 1971, "The Most Crucial Game" in 1972, "Double Exposure" in 1973) and also appeared in the 1990 episode "Columbo Goes to College" as the father of one of two young murderers. He also played the murderer in the pilot episode of Mrs. Columbo starring Kate Mulgrew in the title role.

In 1973, Culp almost took the male lead in the sci-fi television series Space: 1999. During negotiations with creator and executive producer Gerry Anderson, Culp expressed himself to be not only an asset as an actor, but also as a director and producer for the proposed series. The part instead went to Martin Landau.

Culp co-starred in The Greatest American Hero as tough veteran FBI Special Agent Bill Maxwell, who teams up with a high-school teacher who receives superpowers from extraterrestrials. He wrote and directed the second-season finale episode "Lilacs, Mr. Maxwell", with free rein to do the episode as he saw fit. The show lasted three years from 1981 to 1983. He reprised the role in the spin-off pilot The Greatest American Heroine and a voice-over on the stop-motion sketch comedy Robot Chicken. During that time, Culp was rumored to replace Larry Hagman as J. R. Ewing in Dallas. However, Culp firmly denied this, insisting he would never leave his role as Bill Maxwell. In 1987, he reunited with Cosby on The Cosby Show, playing Dr. Cliff Huxtable's old friend Scott Kelly. The name was a combination of their I Spy characters' names.

Culp had a recurring role on Everybody Loves Raymond as Warren Whelan, the father of Debra Barone and father-in-law of Ray Barone. He appeared on episodes of other television programs, including a 1961 season-three episode of Bonanza titled "Broken Ballad", as well as The Golden Girls, The Nanny, The Girls Next Door, and Wings. He was the voice of the character Halcyon Renard in the Disney adventure cartoon Gargoyles.

In I Spy Returns (1994), a nostalgic television movie, Culp and Cosby reprised their roles as Robinson and Scott for the first time since 1968. Culp and Cosby reunited one last time on the television show Cosby in an episode entitled "My Spy" (1999), in which Cosby's character, Hilton Lucas, dreams he is Alexander Scott on a mission with Kelly Robinson. Robert Culp also appeared on Walker, Texas Ranger as Lyle Pike in the episode "Trust No One" (February 18, 1995). In 1997, he played a CIA agent and the father of Dr. Jesse Travis on Diagnosis Murder along with Barbara Bain, Robert Vaughn, and Patrick Macnee.

Film performances
Culp worked as an actor in many theatrical films, beginning with three in 1963: As naval officer John F. Kennedy's good friend Ensign George Ross in PT 109, as legendary gunslinger Wild Bill Hickok in The Raiders, and as the debonair fiancé of Jane Fonda in Sunday in New York.

He starred in Bob & Carol & Ted & Alice in 1969, with Natalie Wood. Another memorable role came as another gunslinger, Thomas Luther Price, in Hannie Caulder (1971) opposite Raquel Welch. A year later, Hickey & Boggs reunited him with Cosby for the first time since I Spy. Culp also directed this feature film, in which Cosby and he portray over-the-hill private eyes. In 1986, he had a primary role as General Woods in the comedy Combat Academy. Culp played the U.S. President in Alan J. Pakula's 1993 murder mystery, The Pelican Brief.

Other appearances
Culp appeared in the 1993 live action video game Voyeur as the game's villain, industrialist/politician Reed Hawke. He lent his voice to the digital character Doctor Breen, the prime antagonist in the 2004 computer game Half-Life 2. The video clip of "Guilty Conscience" features Culp as an erudite and detached narrator describing the scenes where Eminem and Dr. Dre rap lyrics against each other. He only appears in the music video. In the album version, the narrator is Mark Avery.

On November 9, 2007, on The O'Reilly Factor, host Bill O'Reilly interviewed Culp about the actor's career and awarded Culp with the distinction "TV Icon of the Week". Culp played Simon, Blanche's beau, in the episode "Like the Beep Beep Beep of My Tom Tom" when Blanche needs a pacemaker on The Golden Girls.

Writer
Culp wrote scripts for seven I Spy episodes, one of which he also directed. He later wrote and directed two episodes of The Greatest American Hero, including the series finale. Culp also wrote scripts for other television series, including Trackdown, a two-part episode from The Rifleman, and Cain's Hundred.

Personal life
Culp married five times and is the father of five children. With his second wife, Nancy Wilner, he had sons Joshua, Jason, and Joseph, and daughter Rachel. With his last wife, he had another daughter Samantha. Jason Culp is a voice actor who has narrated many audiobooks.

Culp was married to French actress France Nguyen (known as France Nuyen), from 1967 to 1970, whom he met when she guest-starred on I Spy. She appeared in four episodes, two of them written by Culp. Culp and Nuyen also co-hosted the second episode of the TV comedy Turn-On in 1969, but the program was never shown, as the series was cancelled after its first airing.

Culp's grandson, Elmo Kennedy O'Connor, is a rapper and performs under the alias Bones.

Death
On March 24, 2010, Culp, at age 79, died after a fall while on a walk near Runyon Canyon Park. He was buried at Sunset View Cemetery in El Cerrito. A memorial service was held at Grauman's Egyptian Theater in Los Angeles on April 10, 2010.
 
At the time of his death, Culp had just completed performing a supporting role as Blakesley in the film The Assignment. He was also working on several screenplays, including an adaptation of the story of Terry and the Pirates that had already been accepted for filming and was scheduled to start production in Hong Kong in 2012, with Culp directing. Terry and the Pirates had been Culp's favorite comic strip as a boy, and it was his long-time wish to make a film based on it.

Selected filmography

 1957–1960 Dick Powell's Zane Grey Theatre (TV series) as Shad Hudson / Deputy Sam Applegate / Hoby Gilman
 1957–1959 Trackdown (TV series) as Hoby Gilman
 1957 Alfred Hitchcock Presents (TV series) as Clarence
 1960 Outlaws (TV series) as Sam Yadkin
 1960 The Westerner (TV series) as Shep Prescott
 1960–1962 The Rifleman (TV series) as Dave Foley / Colly Vane
 1961 Hennesey (TV series) as Dr. Steven Gray
 1961 Rawhide (TV series) as Craig Kern
 1961 The Detectives Starring Robert Taylor (TV series) as Herbert Sanders
 1961 87th Precinct (TV series) as Curt Donaldson
 1961 Bonanza (TV series) as Ed Payson in the episode "Broken Ballad"
 1961 Target: The Corruptors! (TV series) as Meeker
 1963 Empire (TV series) as Jared Mace
 1963 PT 109 as Ensign George 'Barney' Ross
 1963 Sunday in New York as Russ Wilson
 1963–1964 The Outer Limits (TV series) as Trent / Paul Cameron / Allen Leighton
 1964 Rhino! as Dr. Jim Hanlon
 1964 The Man from U.N.C.L.E. (TV series) as Captain Shark
 1964 Gunsmoke (TV series) as Joe Costa
 1965–1968 I Spy (TV series) as Kelly Robinson / Chuang Tzu
 1968 Get Smart (TV series) as Waiter (uncredited)
 1969 Bob & Carol & Ted & Alice as Bob Sanders
 1970 Married Alive (TV series) as Colonel Peter Jardine
 1970 The Name of the Game (TV series) as Paul Tyler
 1971–1990 Columbo (TV series) as Jordan Rowe / Dr. Bart Kepple / Paul Hanlon / Investigator Brimmer
 1971 Hannie Caulder as Thomas Luther Price
 1971 See the Man Run (TV movie) as Ben Taylor
 1972 Hickey & Boggs (director) as Frank Boggs
 1972 What's My Line? (TV series)
 1973 A Cold Night's Death (TV movie) as Robert Jones
 1973 A Name for Evil as John Blake
 1973 Shaft (TV series) as Marshall Cunningham
 1973 Outrage (TV movie) as Jim Kiler
 1973 Match Game (TV series) as himself - Team Captain
 1974 Houston, We've Got a Problem (TV movie) as Steve Bell
 1974 The Castaway Cowboy as Calvin Bryson
 1975 A Cry for Help (TV movie) as Harry Freeman
 1975 Inside Out as Sly Wells
 1975 Police Story (TV series) as Detective John Darrin
 1976 Sky Riders as Jonas Bracken
 1976 Breaking Point as Frank Sirrianni
 1976 The Great Scout & Cathouse Thursday as Jack Colby
 1976 Flood! (TV movie, Irwin Allen Production) as Steve Brannigan
 1976 Silver Streak as FBI Agent (uncredited)
 1977 Spectre (TV movie) as William Sebastian
 1979 Hot Rod (TV movie) as T. L. Munn
 1979 Goldengirl as Steve Esselton
 1980 The Dream Merchants (TV mini-series) as Henry Farnum
 1981–1983 The Greatest American Hero (TV series) as Bill Maxwell
 1983 National Lampoon's Movie Madness as Paul Everest (segment "Success Wanters")
 1985 Turk 182 as Mayor Tyler
 1986 Murder, She Wrote (TV series) as Norman Amberson
 1986 The Gladiator (TV movie) as Lieutenant Frank Mason
 1986 The Blue Lightning (TV movie) as Lester Mclnally
 1986 Combat High as General Woods
 1987 The Cosby Show (TV series) as Scott Kelly
 1987 Matlock (TV series) as Robert Irwin
 1987 Highway to Heaven (TV series) as Ronald James
 1987 Big Bad Mama II as Daryl Pearson
 1989 Pucker Up and Bark Like a Dog as Gregor
 1990 The Golden Girls (TV series) as Simon
 1991 Timebomb as Mr. Phillips
 1993 The Nanny (TV series) as Stewart Babcock
 1993 The Pelican Brief as The President of The United States
 1994 Wings (TV series) as 'Ace' Galvin
 1995 Panther as Charles Garry
 1995 Xtro 3: Watch the Skies as Major Guardino
 1996 Spy Hard as Businessman
 1996–2004 Everybody Loves Raymond (TV series) as Warren Whelan
 1997 Most Wanted as Dr. Donald Bickhart
 1998 Conan the Adventurer (TV series) as King Vog
 1998 Holding the Baby (TV series)
 1998 The Secret Files of the Spy Dogs (TV series) as Agent Three (voice)
 1998 Wanted as Father Patrick
 1999 Unconditional Love as Karl Thomassen
 1999 "Guilty Conscience" by Eminem (music video) as narrator.
 2000 Innocents as Judge Winston
 2000 Newsbreak as Judge McNamara
 2000 Chicago Hope (TV series) as Benjamin Quinn
 2000 Running Mates (TV movie) as Senator Parker Gable
 2001 Farewell, My Love as Michael Reilly
 2001 Hunger as Chief
 2003 The Dead Zone (TV series) as Jeffrey Grissom
 2004 The Almost Guys as The Colonel
 2004 Half-Life 2 (video game) as Dr. Wallace Breen (voice)
 2005 Santa's Slay as Grandpa Yuleson
 2006 Half-Life 2: Episode One (video game) as Dr. Wallace Breen (voice)
 2007 Robot Chicken (TV series) as Bill Maxwell / Sheriff of Nottingham (voice)
 2010 The Assignment as Blakesley (final film role)

References

External links

 
 
 
 
 
 

1930 births
2010 deaths
20th-century American male actors
21st-century American male actors
20th-century American writers

American male film actors
American male television actors
American male voice actors
American television directors
American television writers
Berkeley High School (Berkeley, California) alumni
Film directors from California
American male television writers
Male Western (genre) film actors
Western (genre) television actors
Writers from Oakland, California
Screenwriters from California
Burials in California
Washington University in St. Louis alumni
University of Washington School of Drama alumni